Elicia Maine is a Canadian academic. She is the W.J. VanDusen Professor of Innovation & Entrepreneurship within Simon Fraser University's Beedie School of Business. She was the founding educational coordinator for New Ventures BC, and the founding Academic Director of Invention to Innovation (i2I), an award-winning graduate program in science & technology commercialization offered in traditional and online formats. Within Simon Fraser University, she serves as Associate Vice President, Knowledge Mobilization & Innovation , providing oversight of SFU Innovates.

Maine serves on the Board of Directors for the Foresight Cleantech Accelerator. and Innovate BC., on the Princeton University Dean for Research Innovation & Entrepreneurship Council and on the Mitacs Research Council.

Her research interests include science innovation, science & technology entrepreneurship, technology-market matching, and innovation policy. Maine was honoured with the 2022 Trailblazer Award in Innovation Policy by the Canadian Science Policy Centre.

Awards 
 Person of the Year Nomination, BC Tech Association, 2016
 TD Canada Trust Distinguished Teaching Award, Beedie School of Business, 2017
 B.C.'s Most Influential Women 2018: Stem Stars, BC Business
 Top Educator Award, BC Cleantech Awards, 2021
 Trailblazer Award, Innovation Policy, Canadian Science Policy Conference, 2022

Selected publications 

 Park, A., Goudarzi, A., Yaghmaie, P., Thomas, V. J., & Maine, E. (2022). Rapid response through the entrepreneurial capabilities of academic scientists. Nature Nanotechnology, 17(8), 802-807. https://doi.org/10.1038/s41565-022-01103-6
 Maine, E., & Garnsey, E. (2006). Commercializing generic technology: The case of advanced materials ventures. Research Policy, 35(3), 375-393. https://doi.org/10.1016/j.respol.2005.12.006
 Maine, E., Soh, P. H., & Dos Santos, N. (2015). The role of entrepreneurial decision-making in opportunity creation and recognition. Technovation, 39, 53-72. https://doi.org/10.1016/j.technovation.2014.02.007

References

External links 
 
North American Debating Championship

Living people
Academic staff of Simon Fraser University
Year of birth missing (living people)
Place of birth missing (living people)
Queen's University at Kingston alumni
Massachusetts Institute of Technology alumni
Alumni of the University of Cambridge
Canadian women academics